Madame Bluebeard (German: Madame Blaubart) is a 1931 Austrian drama film directed by Conrad Wiene and starring Lil Dagover, Harry Frank and Otto Hartmann.

The film's sets were designed by the art director Hans Ledersteger.

Cast
 Lil Dagover as Frau Erika Dankwarth  
 Harry Frank as Helmuth Krüger 
 Otto Hartmann as Baron Terhusen  
 Vera Schmiterlöw as Karla, seine Schwester  
 Anton Edthofer as Schiereisen  
 Vera Salvotti as Die schwarze Käthe  
 Alfred Neugebauer as Sykora  
 Albert Kersten as Lorenz 
 Lotte Deyers as Irre

References

Bibliography 
 Waldman, Harry. Nazi Films in America, 1933-1942. McFarland, 2008.

External links 
 

1931 films
1931 drama films
Austrian drama films
1930s German-language films
Films based on works by Karl Hans Strobl
Films directed by Conrad Wiene
Austrian black-and-white films